Shaun Peter Carey (born 13 May 1976) is a former professional footballer who played as a midfielder. He began his career with Norwich City before playing for Rushden & Diamonds, Stevenage Borough, Chester City, Hornchurch, Weymouth, Droylsden and King's Lynn. Born in England, he made two appearances for the Republic of Ireland U21 national team. Carey was also assistant manager to Keith Webb at King's Lynn and led the side to the FA Cup second round when caretaker manager in 2006–07.

Carey made his debut for Norwich as a substitute on 20 September 1995 in a Football League Cup match against Torquay at Carrow Road. He was released by the club in 2000 having made 76 appearances.

He represented the Republic of Ireland at under-21 level and won Football Conference championship medals at both Rushden and Chester. He was awarded a benefit game between King's Lynn and Norwich in October 2006 when out injured with a double fracture of his leg.

Sources
Canary Citizens by Mark Davage, John Eastwood, Kevin Platt, published by Jarrold Publishing, (2001),

External links

Career information at ex-canaries.co.uk

1976 births
Republic of Ireland association footballers
Republic of Ireland under-21 international footballers
Norwich City F.C. players
Chester City F.C. players
Rushden & Diamonds F.C. players
Stevenage F.C. players
Hornchurch F.C. players
King's Lynn F.C. players
Living people
English Football League players
20th-century Anglo-Irish people
Sportspeople from Kettering
National League (English football) players
Association football midfielders